Crasher(s) may refer to:
 Gate crasher, a person who attends an invitation only event when not invited
 Crasher Squirrel, a squirrel that became an internet meme
 Crasher (Gobots), toy robot characters
 "Crashers", an episode of Law & Order
 Crasher Wake, a Pokémon gym leader